Carry On Regardless is a 1961 British comedy film, the fifth in the series of 31 Carry On films (1958–1992). The film revolves loosely around the activities of a job agency, 'Helping Hands', run by Sid James's character, Bert Handy. By now a fairly regular team was established with Sid James, Kenneth Connor, Charles Hawtrey, Joan Sims and Kenneth Williams all having appeared in previous entries. Hattie Jacques – who was also a regular – makes a cameo appearance during a hospital scene. "Professor" Stanley Unwin appears in a guest role, playing his trademark "gobbledegook" speaking act. This would be the final appearance in the series for early regular Terence Longdon. Liz Fraser makes her debut in Carry On Regardless and would appear in a further three Carry On films.

Plot
Down at the local labour exchange, everyone is moaning about the lack of decent jobs, unaware that nearby Bert Handy and his secretary Miss Cooling are attempting to fill vacancies, at a new enterprise called Helping Hands. When word gets round, people are quick to visit the agency, notably Sam Twist, Francis Courtenay, Delia King, Gabriel Dimple, Lily Duveen, Mike Weston and Montgomery Infield-Hopping. Bert decides to hire them all and at first business is slow. The only customer is a man who speaks gobbledygook but since Francis (who can speak 16 languages) is not present nobody can understand him and he goes on his way. Within a few days business picks up and Delia has an assignment to try on a complete women's wardrobe for Mr Delling, a gentleman who is planning a surprise for his wife. However things get complicated when the man's wife arrives home unexpectedly.

Meanwhile Sam Twist is sent to a baby-sitting job, only to find that there is not a baby to be sat, instead there is Mrs Panting, a woman who needs to make her husband jealous, succeeding in the process with Sam getting a black eye. The following day, Francis is assigned to take a pet for a walk but when he gets to the owner's house, he finds out it is a chimpanzee. He takes the chimp for a walk and soon discovers that people who work in the transport industry have an aversion to apes. They eventually end up at a chimps tea party, enjoying a nice afternoon tea. Next is Lily Duveen, who has been employed at a wine tasting evening, to collect invitation cards from the attendees. After she has performed this task, she samples some of the wines and makes a bit of a spectacle of herself.

Later a man from Amalgamated Scrap-Iron arrives in the Helping Hands office. He is obviously busy as he requests that someone take his place in the queue, at the hospital outpatients department. Bert says he will get someone on the case but the chap insists that the top man does the job himself, so Bert ends up queuing at the hospital, where he is mistaken for an eminent diagnostician and taken on a tour of the hospital. When this mistake is eventually discovered, the nursing Sister telephones the ward Bert is currently visiting. A nurse answers, "Ward 10...?" and Sister replies, "Emergency!" — a cultural reference to the popular TV series "Emergency Ward 10" of the time.

The next job that Francis undertakes, is in the field of photography as a model. Obviously very chuffed that he has been chosen, he is crestfallen when he discovers that the job is an advertisement for a bee-keeper's helmet.
His next job is between a bickering couple. The husband can not understand his wife, who continually berates him in her native German. Thanks to Francis getting a bit emotionally involved, the wife starts speaking English and the couple make up.

Lefty Vincent, a boxing friend of Bert's, pops into the office. He requires four helpers to act as seconds, for his fighter Dynamite Dan. When they get to the venue, Dan is terrified by his opponent, Mickey McGee, so pretends that he has sprained his finger. The fight is off until Gabriel takes on McGee instead. Sam is excited over his next job. Due to a mix-up, he thinks he is on a top secret spying mission to the Forth Bridge (recalling Alfred Hitchcock's film of The 39 Steps), when all that is required of him is to make up a fourth in a game of bridge. When Sam gets back, he learns that the whole of Helping Hands have been engaged to demonstrate exhibits at the Ideal House Exhibition (based on the real Ideal Home Exhibition). Needless to say all of the demonstrations end in calamity. Sam's next job is at an exclusive men's club, where no matter how hard he tries he can not keep silent, which is a strict rule of the establishment.

Miss Cooling decides on a new filing system, for a more streamlined operation and job cards are put in cubby holes for each of the workers. Disaster strikes when the cleaner knocks the box down and puts the cards back all mixed up. Everyone gets someone else's assignment, with misunderstandings all round. Finally, the gobbledygook man turns up again and this time Francis is there to translate. He is their landlord and has been trying to inform Bert that he will have to vacate the premises, because he has had a better offer. Due to a show of unity by all the staff, the landlord agrees that they can stay, on the provision that they do something for him. His main interest is property development and he needs a house cleared and cleaned. Unfortunately the team end up demolishing the house but thankfully it turns out that the landlord has changed his mind and decided to demolish it and replace it with a luxury block of flats (or "flabberblob"), so all ends well.

Cast
Sid James as Bert Handy
Kenneth Connor as Sam Twist
Charles Hawtrey as Gabriel Dimple
Kenneth Williams as Francis Courtenay
"Professor" Stanley Unwin as Landlord
Joan Sims as Lily Duveen
Liz Fraser as Delia King
Terence Longdon as Montgomery Infield-Hopping
Bill Owen as Mike Weston
Esma Cannon as Miss Cooling
Freddie Mills as 'Lefty' Vincent
Fenella Fielding as Penny Panting
Hattie Jacques as Sister
Joan Hickson as Matron
Sydney Tafler as Strip Club Manager
Judith Furse as Headmistress
Howard Marion-Crawford as Wine-Tasting Organiser 
Jimmy Thompson as Mr. Delling
Patrick Cargill as Raffish Store Customer
Molly Weir as Bird Woman
Kynaston Reeves as Sir Theodore
David Lodge as Connoisseur
Jerry Desmonde as Martin Paul
Ambrosine Phillpotts as Yoki's Owner
Nicholas Parsons as Wolf
Cyril Chamberlain as Policeman
Cyril Raymond as Army Officer
Eric Pohlmann as Sinister Man
Julia Arnall  as Trudy Trelawney 
Terence Alexander as Trevor Trelawney
Victor Maddern as First Sinister Passenger
Norman Rossington as Boxing Referee

Crew
Screenplay – Norman Hudis
Music – Bruce Montgomery
Art Director – Lionel Couch
Director of Photography – Alan Hume
Editor – John Shirley
Associate Producer – Basil Keys
Assistant Director – Jack Causey
Camera Operator – Dudley Lovell
Sound Editor – Arthur Ridout
Sound Recordists – Robert T MacPhee & Gordon McCallum
Unit Manager – Claude Watson
Hairdressing – Biddy Crystal
Continuity – Gladys Goldsmith
Make-up – George Blackler
Costume Designer – Joan Ellacott
Casting Director – Betty White
Producer – Peter Rogers
Director – Gerald Thomas

Filming and locations

Filming dates – 28 November 1960 – 17 January 1961

Interiors:
 Pinewood Studios, Buckinghamshire

Exteriors:
 The corner of Park Street and Sheet Street in Windsor, Berkshire, doubled for the Helping Hands Agency. The location was used again a decade later for the Wedded Bliss agency in Carry On Loving.

Reception
The film was the 10th most popular movie at the UK box office in 1961.

Variety wrote, "Ingenuity of scriptwriter Norman Hudis is sometimes a bit strained, but he has come up with some sound comedy situations. Hudis' dialog is also lively, relying on a great deal of double meanings, saucy vulgarity and the various personalities of the lengthy cast. Even down to the smallest one, the roles are played by actors well experienced in jumping through the comedy hoops that director Gerald Thomas tosses deftly in the air." Margaret Harford of the Los Angeles Times wrote that the film "is too scrambled to be consistently funny but regular addicts of the series will enjoy the obvious humor inherent in any outfit labeled the Helping Hand Employment Agency." The Monthly Film Bulletin opined that "mostly the gags have long since grown old gracelessly in the hallowed tradition of British music-hall and farce. This comedy seems staler, less yeasty than, say, Carry On Nurse. But the series has worked up such popular appeal it can probably coast along on that momentum very nicely for some time, before the public finally calls its bluff."

References

Bibliography

Keeping the British End Up: Four Decades of Saucy Cinema by Simon Sheridan (third edition) (2007) (Reynolds & Hearn Books)

External links

''Carry on Regardless' at Britmovie
Carry On Regardless at The Whippit Inn

1961 films
1960s English-language films
1961 comedy films
Regardless
Films directed by Gerald Thomas
Films shot at Pinewood Studios
British black-and-white films
Films produced by Peter Rogers
Films with screenplays by Norman Hudis
1960s British films